The Guinea national handball team is the national handball team of Guinea.

African Championship record
1981 – 8th place
2020 – 10th place
2022 – 6th place

References

External links
IHF profile

Men's national handball teams
National sports teams of Guinea
Handball in Guinea